James Rose, MA (c.1655–1733) was a Scottish Episcopal clergyman who served as the Bishop of Fife from 1731 to 1733.

He was consecrated at Edinburgh as a college bishop on 29 November 1726 by bishops David Freebairn, Andrew Cant and Alexander Duncan. He and other college bishops were consecrated to maintain the Episcopal succession without being committed to a particular Episcopal see. Five years later, he became the bishop of the Diocese of Fife in December 1731.

He died in office on 4 April 1733, aged 78.

References 

 
 
 

1655 births
1733 deaths
Bishops of Fife
College bishops